Leslie Rodriguez Kritzer (born May 24, 1977) is an American singer and musical theatre actress.

Life and career
Leslie Rodriguez Kritzer was born in Manhattan and raised in Livingston, New Jersey. Her father is Jewish, and her mother is of Puerto Rican ancestry. Kritzer was raised Catholic. She attended Livingston High School, graduating in 1995. A 1999 graduate of the University of Cincinnati – College-Conservatory of Music, she has appeared on Broadway in Hairspray as Shelly and in Legally Blonde as Serena. Off-Broadway she appeared in The Great American Trailer Park Musical, Bat Boy, and Godspell, and her regional credits include Vanities (Kathy), Babes in Arms (Baby Rose), and both Grease (Rizzo) and Funny Girl (Fanny) at Paper Mill Playhouse.

Kritzer starred in Leslie Kritzer is Patti LuPone at Les Mouches, a recreation of Patti LuPone's famed nightclub act. The show premiered at Joe's Pub and was conceived and directed by Ben Rimalower. She received a 2006 Drama Desk nomination for Outstanding Featured Actress in a Musical for The Great American Trailer Park Musical, followed by a 2007 Special Achievement MAC Award for her show Leslie Kritzer Is Patti LuPone at Les Mouches, and a 2007 Clarence Derwent Award for her performance as Serena in Legally Blonde.

Kritzer starred in A Catered Affair, portraying Janey Hurley, the character played by Debbie Reynolds in the 1956 feature film of the same name. A Catered Affair ran on Broadway from March 2008 through July 27, 2008. She starred in the Encores! staged concert presentation of On the Town in November 2008 as Hildy, the amorous and aggressive taxi driver.

In the 2009 New York Musical Theatre Festival, she performed in Judas and Me as the angel Gabriel. In March 2009 Kritzer played Monica in the Off-Broadway musical Rooms: A Rock Romance. In December 2009, she performed in the musical Pop! at the Yale Repertory Theatre. The musical is based on the life of Andy Warhol. Kritzer portrayed Valerie, a character based on Valerie Solanas.

In March 2010, she, along with Tom Wopat, Vanessa L. Williams, and Barbara Cook, starred in a new musical revue, Sondheim on Sondheim. The Roundabout Theatre Company limited engagement production opened on Broadway at Studio 54 on March 19, 2010, in previews and closed June 13, 2010. It was directed by James Lapine who conceived this revue of music by Stephen Sondheim.

In the 2015–16 season, Kritzer starred in two Off-Broadway productions. She starred in the Vineyard Theatre's production of Gigantic, which opened on December 3, 2015. Kritzker then starred as Salome in the 2016 Roundabout Theatre Company production of The Robber Bridegroom, which opened March 13, 2016. For her performance, she was nominated twice for the 2016 Lortel Award for Outstanding Featured Actress in a Musical. She won the award for her performance in The Robber Bridegroom. Kritzer joined the principal cast of Something Rotten! on July 18, 2016, replacing Heidi Blickenstaff as Bea.

She appeared in the new musical The Honeymooners as Alice Kramden. The musical is based on the television show The Honeymooners and premiered at the Paper Mill Playhouse in Milburn, New Jersey, on September 28, 2017. The musical starred Michael McGrath as Ralph Kramden, Michael Mastro as Ed Norton, and Laura Bell Bundy as Trixie Norton and was directed by John Rando. Kritzer had previously appeared in a workshop of the musical in 2014.

Kritzer starred in the musical version of Beetlejuice as Delia Schlimmer and Miss Argentina, which premiered at the National Theatre in Washington, D.C., in October 2018 before transferring to the Winter Garden Theatre on Broadway, beginning previews in March and opening in April. The production closed on March 10, 2020, due to the COVID-19 pandemic. In September 2021 it was announced that Beetlejuice would reopen on Broadway, at the Marquis Theatre, in April 2022. Kritzer returned as Delia.

Personal life
Kritzer married musical director Vadim Feichtner at New York City Center on February 22, 2013. The couple met at NYU and began dating after the final performance of the Encores! production of On the Town in 2008, in which Kritzer starred. The two have worked together on multiple productions since.

Filmography

Television

Theatre

See also
 List of Puerto Ricans
 History of the Jews in Puerto Rico

References

External links

1977 births
Living people
Actresses from New Jersey
Actresses from New York City
American women singers
American musical theatre actresses
American actresses of Puerto Rican descent
American people of Jewish descent
Clarence Derwent Award winners
Hispanic and Latino American actresses
Jewish singers
Livingston High School (New Jersey) alumni
People from Livingston, New Jersey
People from Manhattan
University of Cincinnati – College-Conservatory of Music alumni